Baliochila dubiosa, the dubious buff, is a butterfly in the family Lycaenidae. It is found in eastern Kenya and north-eastern Tanzania. Its habitat consists of lowland forests.

References

Butterflies described in 1953
Poritiinae